Myrmecopsis is a genus of tiger moths in the family Erebidae. The genus was described by Newman in 1850.

Species
Myrmecopsis hyalozona (Felder, 1874)
Myrmecopsis polistes (Hübner, 1818)
Myrmecopsis strigosa (Druce, 1884)

References

Euchromiina
Moth genera